The Metropolitan Council of Lyon is the deliberative assembly of the Lyon metropolis, a territorial collectivity with special status, made up of 150 metropolitan councilors.

History 
Created on 1 January 2015, the metropolis of Lyon replaced the urban community of Lyon and, in its territory, the Rhône department. It exercises both the competences of a department and those of a metropolitan area.

Since 2020, the city council, comprising 150 members (instead of the 166 originally planned in the ministerial ordinance before its review in parliament), is elected at the same time as the municipal councils by direct universal suffrage within the framework of 14 electoral constituencies according to the voting method applicable to municipalities with more than 1,000 inhabitants.

Headquarters 
The headquarters of the city of Lyon is the same as that of the former urban community of Lyon: the building at 20 rue du Lac in the 3rd arrondissement of Lyon, in the district of La Part Dieu.

Executive 
The Metropolitan Council was re-elected on June 28, 2020 and elected a new president, Bruno Bernard (EÉLV). The Council is made up of a president and 23 vice-presidents:

References 

Lyon
Auvergne-Rhône-Alpes
Lyon